Montegallo is a comune (municipality) in the Province of Ascoli Piceno in the Italian region Marche, located about  south of Ancona and about  west of Ascoli Piceno.

Montegallo borders the following municipalities: Acquasanta Terme, Arquata del Tronto, Comunanza, Montemonaco, Roccafluvione.

References

External links
 Official website

Cities and towns in the Marche